Sandusky County Regional Airport  is a county-owned public-use airport located five nautical miles (9 km) southeast of the central business district of Fremont, a city in Sandusky County, Ohio, United States.

History 
The airport sits on land owned by the county. However, the airport was privately managed, and all its facilities privately owned, until Sandusky County bought the airport in 2012 in an effort to keep it from closing.

Facilities and aircraft 
Sandusky County Regional Airport has one runway designated 6/24 with a 5,500 by 100 ft (1,676 x 30 m) asphalt pavement. For the 12-month period ending September 16, 2021, the airport had 5,616 aircraft operations, an average of 15 per day: 81% general aviation, 20% air taxi and <1% military. At that time there were 16 aircraft based at this airport: 13 single-engine airplanes, 1 multi-engine airplane, and 2 helicopters.

The airpot has a fixed-base operator that sells avgas and jet fuel as well as offering amenities such as general maintenance, catering, courtesy transportation, a conference room, a crew lounge, and showers.

In May, 2022, the airport received $1.6 million from the U.S. Department of Transportation to reconstruct Apron A. Additional funding was provided by the Ohio Department of Transportation.

References

External links
 Sandusky County Regional Airport Homepage
 

Airports in Ohio
Transportation in Sandusky County, Ohio
Buildings and structures in Sandusky County, Ohio